Maguindanao del Sur, officially the Province of Maguindanao del Sur (Jawi:دايرت نو ڤاڬابڬتنن ماڬينداناو ), is a landlocked province in the Philippines located in the Bangsamoro Autonomous Region in Muslim Mindanao in Mindanao. Its capital is the municipality of Buluan near the city of Tacurong in the neighboring province of Sultan Kudarat. It borders Cotabato province to the east, Maguindanao del Norte to the west, and Sultan Kudarat to the south.

History
Maguindanao del Sur was formed when Maguindanao province was split into two provinces; the other province being Maguindanao del Norte. The division occurred following a plebiscite on September 17, 2022 which ratified Republic Act 11550 which proposed the partitioning of the province. As per law former Maguindanao Governor Mariam Mangudadatu was expected to become the governor of the newly formed Maguindanao del Sur province. However an issue arose since the determination of the first set of officials of the province presumes that the plebiscite was held prior to the 2022 national and local elections. However the plebiscite was postponed to a date after the elections. This led to the Commission on Elections to come up with a legal opinion. The position was issued on September 28, 2022, where the election body conclude that only the Department of the Interior and Local Government could appoint the first officials of the province.

Mangudadatu would assume the position and take oath as governor of the new province in October 13, 2022. Nathaniel Midtimbang, board member of Maguindanao's Provincial Board, became her vice governor. A transition period would take place until January 9, 2023.

Geography

Maguindanao del Sur is composed of 24 municipalities and 1 legislative district.

Demographics

References

 
Provinces of the Philippines
Provinces of Bangsamoro
States and territories established in 2022
2022 establishments in the Philippines